The Desoto Annex is a state prison for men located in Arcadia, DeSoto County, Florida, owned and operated by the Florida Department of Corrections.

This facility has a mix of security levels, including minimum, medium, and close, and houses adult male offenders.  Desoto Annex first opened in 1996 as an extension to the main Desoto facility, which has since closed.  The Annex holds a maximum of 1453 prisoners.

References

Prisons in Florida
Buildings and structures in DeSoto County, Florida
1996 establishments in Florida